Vicente Besuijen (born 10 April 2001) is a professional football player who plays as a forward for Eredivisie club Excelsior Rotterdam, on loan from Scottish Premiership club Aberdeen. Born in Colombia, he represented the Netherlands at youth level. 

On 24 January 2022, Besuijen joined Scottish Premiership side Aberdeen on a four-and-a-half year contract from Eerste Divisie side ADO Den Haag.

On 31 January 2023, Besuijen joined Eredivisie club Excelsior Rotterdam on loan until the end of the season with an option to buy.

Personal life
Besuijen was born in Colombia, but was adopted by his Dutch parents when he was three months old. He grew up in Amstelveen.

References

External links

2001 births
Living people
Dutch footballers
Colombian footballers
Association football forwards
ADO Den Haag players
Aberdeen F.C. players
Eredivisie players
Eerste Divisie players
Footballers from Bogotá
Sportspeople from Amstelveen
Footballers from North Holland

Excelsior Rotterdam players